Léon Rosper (born 14 January 1899, date of death unknown) was a Belgian footballer. He played in one match for the Belgium national football team in 1927.

References

External links
 

1899 births
Year of death missing
Belgian footballers
Belgium international footballers
Place of birth missing
Association footballers not categorized by position